Newsbreak may refer to:
Newsbreak (magazine), Philippines-based news publication
SNL Newsbreak, the name of Saturday Night Live’s Weekend Update segment from 1981 to 1982
News broadcasting, televised news programming
Nine's Newsbreak, the name of Nine News’s News Update title
 News Break, a localized news site cofounded by Jerry Yang